Diego Peralta may refer to:

 Diego Peralta (Colombian footballer) (born 1985), Colombian football player
 Diego Peralta (Argentine footballer) (born 1996), Argentine-Italian football player